Zirka (Zerkä) is a rural locality (a village) in Maximovsky Selsoviet, Yanaulsky District, Bashkortostan, Russia. The population was 18 as of 2010. There is 1 street.

Geography 
Zirka is located 41 km southeast of Yanaul (the district's administrative centre) by road. Sibady is the nearest rural locality.

References 

Rural localities in Yanaulsky District